Homeobox protein SIX5 is a protein that in humans is encoded by the SIX5 gene.

References

Further reading

External links 
 

Transcription factors